Frogger's Journey: The Forgotten Relic is an action-adventure videogame. It is part of Frogger Series by Konami and was released for Game Boy Advance in October 2003 in North America and June 2004 in Japan. The game includes eighteen levels to complete that become more complex as players advance through them. Unlike previous games, where getting hit once meant players lost a life, Frogger has a health bar in The Forgotten Relic.

Reception

Notes

References

External links
 Frogger's Journey: The Forgotten Relic on Mobygames

2003 video games
Action-adventure games
Game Boy Advance games
Game Boy Advance-only games
Frogger
Video games developed in the United States